are Japanese film series directed by Haruyasu Noguchi who directed Gappa: The Triphibian Monster. The lead star is Keiichirō Akagi. He played skilled gunman in the series. Based on Rei Kido's novel "Nuki Uchi Sansirō".

Kenju burai-chō Nukiuchino Ryu

(Rereased date 1960,February 14, Running time 86minutes, Screen play by Gan Yamazaki)
Keiichirō Akagi as Kenzaki Ryu
Joe Shishido as Korto no Gin
Ruriko Asaoka as Ishii Midori
Ichiro Sugai as Shizu
Kaku Takashina as Gen
Arihiro Fujimura as Cho
Kō Nishimura as Yo Sangen

Kenju burai-chō Denkō Setsuka no Otoko

(Rereased date 1960, May14, Running time 86 minutes, Screenplay by Takeo Matsura)
Keiichirō Akagi as Jōji 
Ruriko Asaoka as Keiko
Hideaki Nitani as Otsu Noboru
Mari Shiraki as JIna Nakagawa
Kaku Takanashi as Tatsukichi
Sayuri Yoshinaga as Setsuko

Kenju burai-chō Futeki ni Warauotoko

(Rereased date 1960, August6, Running time 84 minutes, Screen play by Gan Yamazaki)
Keiichirō Akagi as Dan Ryujirō
Reiko Sasamori as Saeki Hiroko
Joe Shishido as Korto no Ken
Kyōji Aoyama as Mishima Gorō
Sayuri Yoshinaga as Dan Noriko
Shōki Fukae as Tetsu

Kenju burai-chō Asunaki Otoko

(Rereased date 1960, December3, Running time 85 minutes, Screen play by Takeo Matsura)
Keiichirō Akagi as Dan Ryujirō
Reiko Sasamori as Arimura Michiko
Joe Shishido as Korto  no Joe
Eiji Gō as Mishima
Yōko Minamida as Sumi

Other adaptation
Nukiuchi no Ryu  Kenju no Uta (April 4, 1964) Starring Hideki Takahashi
Kenju burai-chō Nagaremono no Mure (January 15, 1965) Starring Akira Kobayashi

References

Nikkatsu films
1960s Japanese films